Peter Hugh Davids (born 22 November 1947) is a Canadian New Testament scholar and Catholic priest. He retired as Professor of Christianity at Houston Baptist University.
He has also taught biblical studies at Regent College in Vancouver, British Columbia, Trinity (Episcopal) School for Ministry in Ambridge, Pennsylvania, and Canadian Theological Seminary in Regina, Saskatchewan.

He has a bachelor of arts from Wheaton College (1968), a Masters in Divinity from Trinity Evangelical Divinity School (1971), and a Ph.D from Victoria University of Manchester (1974). Davids is author of major commentaries on the Biblical books of James and 1 Peter. He was ordained a priest in the Personal Ordinariate of the Chair of St. Peter (i.e. Anglican use) in 2014.

Bibliography

Articles

References

External links
Publisher's author profile
His St Paul's Center profile

20th-century Roman Catholic theologians
Living people
1947 births
Houston Christian University faculty
Trinity Evangelical Divinity School alumni
Wheaton College (Illinois) alumni
Alumni of the University of Manchester
Religious leaders from Syracuse, New York
New Testament scholars
Bible commentators
21st-century Roman Catholic theologians
Canadian Roman Catholic theologians